Prince Louis Napoléon Murat (22 December 1851 – 22 September 1912) was a French military officer and member of the House of Murat.

Personal life
Murat was born on 22 December 1851 in Passy, France, the youngest child of Lucien Charles Joseph Napoléon, 3rd Prince Murat, and Caroline Georgina Fraser, former governess at the residence of Joseph Bonaparte in Bordentown, New Jersey. He was a grandson of Caroline Bonaparte, sister of Napoleon, and the godson of Napoléon III.

Murat married Eudoxia Mikhailovna Somova (1850–1924), widow of Prince Alexander Orbeliani, in Odessa in 1873. They had three sons. The eldest was Prince Eugène Louis Michel Joachim Napoléon (1875–1906), who married Violette Ney, daughter of Michel Aloys Ney, 3rd Duke of Elchingen, and died in an automobile accident in 1906. The middle son was Oscar Charles Joachim (1876–1884). The youngest was Prince Michel Anne Charles Joachim Napoléon (1887–1941), who married Helena MacDonald Stallo, heiress to the Standard Oil fortune, in 1913.

Murat died in hospital in Paris on 22 September 1912 following a surgical operation.

Military career
Murat began his military career in the French Navy in 1869. Following the Franco-Prussian War in 1870, he left to join the Swedish Navy. There, he was commissioned as a lieutenant and served as aide-de-camp to both Charles XV and Oscar II until his marriage in 1873.

Ancestry

References

1851 births
1912 deaths
Murat
Swedish Navy officers